Baron Middleton, of Middleton in the County of Warwick, is a title in the Peerage of Great Britain, created in December 1711 for Sir Thomas Willoughby, 2nd Baronet, who had previously represented Nottinghamshire and Newark in Parliament. It was one of twelve new peerages created together and known as Harley's Dozen, to give a Tory majority in the House of Lords.

The Willoughby Baronetcy, of Wollaton in the County of Nottingham, had been created in the Baronetage of England in 1677, for the first baron’s elder brother Francis Willoughby, who at the time was aged only about nine, with special remainder to him, the first baronet’s only brother, and he duly succeeded him when his brother died at the age of twenty in 1688. Their father, the landowner and naturalist Francis Willughby (1635–1672), of Middleton Hall, Warwickshire, had died when they were both small children.

The first Lord Middleton was followed by his eldest son, the second Baron (1692–1758), who had previously sat as one of the Members of Parliament for Nottinghamshire and Tamworth. He was succeeded by his son, the third baron, who died unmarried, and then by a younger son, the fourth Baron. The direct line then failed, and Henry Willoughby, 5th Baron Middleton (1726–1800) was the son of the Hon. Thomas Willoughby (c. 1694–1742), second son of the first Baron. On the death of his son, the sixth Baron (1761–1835) this line also failed.

Digby Willoughby, 7th Baron Middleton (1769–1856) was a grandson of the second son of the first Baron, a captain in the Royal Navy. He died unmarried and was succeeded by his cousin, the eighth Baron, the grandson of Reverend the Hon. James Willoughby, younger son of Thomas Willoughby, second son of the first Baron. He was succeeded by his eldest son, the ninth Baron, who in his turn was succeeded by his younger brother, the 10th Baron. On the latter's death, the titles passed to his second but eldest surviving son, the 11th Baron. He was Lord Lieutenant of the East Riding of Yorkshire. Since 2011, the titles are held by his grandson, the 13th Baron.

Extensive estate and personal papers of the Willoughby family are held in the Middleton collection at the department of Manuscripts and Special Collections, The University of Nottingham.

The current family seat is Birdsall House, near Malton, North Yorkshire. The Middleton family owned Wollaton Hall, a stately home near Nottingham on which Mentmore Towers was based, and Middleton Hall in Warwickshire until they were sold by the 11th Baron in the 1920s.

Baronets of Wollaton (1677)
Sir Francis Willoughby, 1st Baronet, of Wollaton (1668–1688)
Sir Thomas Willoughby, 2nd Baronet, of Wollaton (1670–1729) (created Baron Middleton in 1711)

Barons Middleton (1711)
Thomas Willoughby, 1st Baron Middleton (1670–1729)
Francis Willoughby, 2nd Baron Middleton (1692–1758)
Francis Willoughby, 3rd Baron Middleton (1726–1774)
Thomas Willoughby, 4th Baron Middleton (1728–1781)
Henry Willoughby, 5th Baron Middleton (1726–1800)
Henry Willoughby, 6th Baron Middleton (1761–1835)
Digby Willoughby, 7th Baron Middleton (1769–1856)
Henry Willoughby, 8th Baron Middleton (1817–1877)
Digby Wentworth Bayard Willoughby, 9th Baron Middleton (1844–1922)
Godfrey Ernest Percival Willoughby, 10th Baron Middleton (1847–1924)
Michael Guy Percival Willoughby, 11th Baron Middleton (1887–1970)
(Digby) Michael Godfrey John Willoughby, 12th Baron Middleton (1921–2011)
Michael Charles James Willoughby, 13th Baron Middleton (b. 1948)

The heir apparent is the present holder's eldest son, the Hon. James William Michael Willoughby (b. 1976).
The heir apparent's heir, and next in line, is his elder son Thomas Michael Jonathan Willoughby (b. 2007)

References

External links
Papers of Barons Middleton and their predecessors, held at Manuscripts and Special Collections at The University of Nottingham

Baronies in the Peerage of Great Britain
Noble titles created in 1711